Harshadev Madhav (born 20 October 1954) is a Sanskrit and Gujarati language poet and writer who won the Sahitya Akademi Award for Sanskrit in 2006 for his work of poetry, Tava Sparshe Sparshe. He had composed over 2200 poems in Sanskrit as of 1992.

Early life 
Harshavadan Mansukhlal Jani was born on 20 October 1954 in Vartej, a city in Bhavnagar district to Mansukhlal and Nandanben. He took his primary education from Vartej Primary School. He completed his high school education (old ssc) in 1971 from Koliyak Madhyamik Shala, Koliyak. He got his Bachelor of Arts as an external student from Saurashtra University in 1975. While working in a telegraph office in Palitana, he completed his Master of Arts in 1981 with Sanskrit from Saurashtra University with first rank, and subsequently became a lecturer at H. K. Arts College, Ahmedabad. He completed B.Ed in 1983 and Ph.D in 1990 from Gujarat University. He received Ph.D for his research work " Mukhya Puranoma Shap Ane Teno Prabhav" (Curse Element And Its Influence In Major Puranas).

He married Shruti Jani on 29 April 1985 and they have a son, Rushiraj Jani.

He participated in the Kavisammelana at the 13th World Sanskrit Conference, Edinburgh and the 14th World Sanskrit Conference, Kyoto.

Work 
He is credited with introducing Japanese Haiku and Tanka, and Korean Sijo, into Sanskrit poetry. 
Samir Kumar Datta puts in him the category of modernist or revolutionary Sanskrit poets, and says:

Recognition 
 Kavilok Śisukāvya Prize (1979)
 Gujarat Sanskrit Academy Award in 1994
 Kalpavalli Award by Bharatiya Bhasha Parishad, Calcutta in 1997–98
 All-India Kalidas Award for 1997–98 for Nishkyantaha Sarve, awarded by the Madhya Pradesh Kalidas Akademi.
 Ramakrishna Sanskrit Award by Saraswati Vikasa Canada in 1998
 Sahitya Akademi Award for Tava Sparśe Sparśe in 2006
 Sahitya Gaurav Puraskar for 2010

List of books

Sanskrit poetry collection
 Rathyāsu Jambuvarņāņām Širāņām (1985)
 Alakanandā (1990)
 Sabdānām Nirmaksikesu Dhvamsāvaseseşu (1993)
 Mṛgayā (1994)
 Lāvārasadigdhāh Swapnamayāḥ Parvatāh (1996)
 Bṛhannalā (Episode) (1995)
 Asicca Me Manasi (1996)
 Niskrāntāh Sarve (1997)
 Purā yatra Srotaḥ (1998)
 Kālośmi (1999)
 Mṛtyuśatakaṃ (1999)
 Suṣumņāyāṃ Nimagnā Naukā (1999)
 Bhāvasthirāņi Jananāntarasauhrdāni (2000)
 Kannakyā Kṣiptaṃ Māṇikyanūpuraṃ (2000-2001), 
 Sudhāsíndhormadye (2002)
 Manaso Naimiņāraṇam (2004)
 Rşeh Kșubdhe Cetasi (2004)
 Tava Sparse sparse (2004)
 Bhati Te Bhāratam (2007)
 Sparsalajjākomalā Smrtih (2006) 
 Tathāstu

Collections of Sanskrit-dramas
 Mrtyurayam Kastūrimrgośti (1998)
 Kalpavrkşah (2001)

Sanskrit Novel
 Mūko Rāmagirirbhūtvā (6/3/2008)

Book of Modern Sanskrit Criticism (in Sanskrit)
 Nakhadarpanah (8/2/2008)

Books of Criticism (in Gujarati)
 Mahākāvi Māgha (1993)
 Paurāņika Kathāo Ane Akhayāno (1997)
 Sanskrit Samakālina Kavitā
 Nakhānām Pāņdityam (1998)
 Nakhacihna (2001)

Collected Poems
 Head Lines Again (1999) (English)
 Paksi ke pankha Para Gagan (1999) (Hindi)
 Alakananda aur Anyānya Kavita (oriya) by Bibekananda Panigrahi (2004)
 Smrtiyon ki Jirņa Śrāvastā Nagarimen (Hindi) (2008)
 Buddhasya Bhiksāpatre (Hindi) (2008-2009)

Translated work
 Sanskritanun Bhāṣāstriya Adhyayana (translation of a book by Bholashankar Vyas)

Books edited
 Sanskrit Sahityamāņ Mahātmā Gāndhi (1999)
 Rturāja Vasanta (2006)
 Āpaņāņ Varşākāvyo (2006)
 Pșthavinā Premano Paryāya : Patni (2008)
 Parama Tattva Siva (2003)
 Vaicārika Krātinā paripreksyamān Sanskrit Sāhitya (2006)
 Sanskrit Sāhitya Ane Cosatha Kalão (2006)
 Sanskrit Sāhitymāņ Ādhyātmikatā ane Jivanadarśana bor
 Sanskrit Sāhityamān Sāmājika Cetanā

Books of research on 'Tantra-śāstra'
 Mantranāņ Rahasyo, Mantroddhāra ane Yantrasiddhio (2003)
 Śakta Tantramāņ Srividyanāņ Rahasyo (2006)
 Sri Sukta, Sriyantra ane Śrividhyā (2007)
 Pratyaksa Brahma : Ganesa

Hindi Poetry Collection
 Tanhaiyon Ki Paravarisa (2008)

Gujarati Poetry Collections
 Hāth Phamphose Āndhala Sugandhane (1985)
 Pāna Saranāmuṇ Na Jāņe Jhādanun Ā Deśamāņ (1997)
 Mobilenun Bhūta (2006)
 Kalpavrksani Lekhaņa Laine (2006)

Collection of Gujarati Short Stories
 Ksaņaswapna (2000)

Books on Sanskrit Grammar
 Vyāvaharika Sanskrit Vyākaraṇa (1995)
 Upasarga, Chirūpa, Nāmadhātu ane Krdanta vicāra (1996)
 Kārakavicāra (1998)
 Lakāravicāra (2001)
 Sandhi ane Samāsa Vicara (2003)
 Sanskrit Siksika (by Kamlashankar Trivedi) (2004)
 Kr, 'Bhū' ane 'As'nā Prayogo ane anuprayogo (2007)

Dictionaries
 Pārsva picture Dictionary (2000)
 Śri Vāni Citraśabdakośa (2001)
 Sacitra Amarakośa

Books on teaching and learning Conversational Sanskrit
 Sanskritani Ābohavamān (1993)
 Sanskritanā Varsādamān (1996)
 Sanskritnā Upavanamān (1998)
 Sanskritnā Nagamāņ (2001)
 Sanskrit Bhāsā kausalyam (2006)
 Sanskritvāgvyavahāra (2004)

Edited Works
 Sanskrita Sahityamān Mahātmā Gāndhi (1998)
 Kādambari (2000)
 Amruśatakam (1996)

Criticism on Sanskrit Sastras
 Dharmaśāstrano Paricayātmaka Itihāsa (with Rushiraj Jani)
 Bharatanun Rasasūtra Rūpakanā Prākāro Dwani Siddhānta ane dwaninā prakaro (2006)

Co-Edited books
 Kāvyaprakāśa (1990)
 Gangālahari (1990)
 Naisadhiyacaritam (1991)
 Řgveda - Mandal X (1992)
 Karnabhāram (1994)
 Buddhacaritam (third canto) 1993
 Ratnāvali (1993)
 Sundarakāndam (1993)
 Kathopanisada (1994)
 Mundakopanisada (1994)
 Sāundarnadam Canto 3 and 4 (1994)
 Sanskrit Sāhityano Itihāsa (1999)
 Manusmrti (Book 6) (1997)
 Santavilāsa ane karuņavilāsa (2001)
 Kāsambari - Sukanasopadeśah (2004
 Jātakamāla (2005–2006)
 Vaidika Suktamanjūsā (2005) 
 Vaidikavanamaya (2008)

Books for children literature
 Gāgaramā Sāgara (1999)
 Purāņoni Vārtāo (1999)
 Ekatā Jhindābāda (2003)
 Dākaņano Dara (2005)

References

External links

 Blog
 More books

Recipients of the Sahitya Akademi Award in Sanskrit
Living people
1954 births
Sanskrit writers
Sanskrit poets
20th-century Indian poets
Gujarat University alumni
People from Gandhinagar
21st-century Indian poets
Poets from Gujarat
Indian male poets
20th-century Indian male writers
21st-century Indian male writers